Justine Bouchard (born January 12, 1986) is a Canadian freestyle wrestler from Calgary, Alberta. Bouchard won a gold medal at the 2010 Commonwealth Games.

References

External links
Wrestling Canada profile

1986 births
Living people
Canadian female sport wrestlers
Commonwealth Games gold medallists for Canada
Wrestlers at the 2010 Commonwealth Games
Pan American Games competitors for Canada
Wrestlers at the 2011 Pan American Games
World Wrestling Championships medalists
Commonwealth Games medallists in wrestling
20th-century Canadian women
21st-century Canadian women
Medallists at the 2010 Commonwealth Games